The University of Jamestown is a private Christian university in Jamestown, North Dakota. Founded in 1883 by the Presbyterian Church, it has about 1,300 students enrolled and has been co-educational from its founding. Until August 2013, the school was known as Jamestown College.

History

The University of Jamestown was founded as Jamestown College in 1883, but closed fairly quickly during the depression of 1893.  The school reopened in 1909 and has remained in operation ever since.

In 1979, Jamestown College's football team went to the NAIA National Championships.

Two graduates of the institution have become Rhodes Scholars.

In 2013, in light of a new master's program and applied doctorate degree program, Jamestown College changed its name to the University of Jamestown.

In 2018, Dr. Robert Badal retired from his position as university president after serving in the role for nearly 16 years. He was succeeded by Dr. Polly Peterson.

Athletics
The Jamestown athletic teams are called the Jimmies. The university is a member of the National Association of Intercollegiate Athletics (NAIA), primarily competing in the Great Plains Athletic Conference (GPAC) since the 2018–19 school year. The Jimmies previously competed in the North Star Athletic Association (NSAA) from 2013–14 to 2017–18, and in the defunct Dakota Athletic Conference (DAC) from 2000–01 to 2011–12, as well as an NAIA Independent within the Association of Independent Institutions (AII) during the 2012–13 school year.

Jamestown competes in 24 intercollegiate varsity sports: Men's sports include baseball, basketball, cross country, football, golf, ice hockey (Division 1 and Division II), soccer, track and field (indoor and outdoor), volleyball and wrestling; while women's sports include basketball, cross country, golf, ice hockey, soccer, softball, swimming & diving, track & field (indoor and outdoor), volleyball and wrestling; and co-ed sports include eSports and shotgun sports.

Ice hockey
Starting in the 2016–17 school year, the University of Jamestown introduced a men's ice hockey team that competes in the American Collegiate Hockey Association Division 1 (ACHA); a Division II men's team started competitive play in the 2020–21 season. The school announced in 2021 that they would field a women's hockey team for the 2022–23 season.

Notable people

Alumni
 Richard K. Armey (1962), U.S. Representative from Texas and House Majority Leader
 Ron Erhardt (1953), head coach of the NFL New England Patriots
 Ralph R. Erickson (1980), former chief judge on the United States District Court for the District of North Dakota and judge on the United States Court of Appeals for the Eighth Circuit
 Jessica Haak, former member of the North Dakota House of Representatives
 Donald D. Lorenzen (1920–80), Los Angeles, California, City Council member, 1969–77
 George W. Johnson, President of George Mason University (1979–1996)
 John Knauf, justice of the North Dakota Supreme Court (attended but graduated elsewhere)
 Cory Mantyka, Canadian football player
 Barbara McClintock (1976), illustrator and author of children's books
 David Nething, Former member of the North Dakota State Senate
 Raquel Pa'aluhi, professional Mixed Martial Artist, currently competing for Invicta FC
 Alvin Plantinga (1950), John A. O'Brien Professor of Philosophy at the University of Notre Dame.  Author and philosopher
 Jasper Schneider, former acting administrator of the USDA Rural Utilities Service
 Kurt Schork (1969), reporter
 Kyle Schweigert, head football coach at the University of North Dakota
 J. J. Syvrud, American football player

Faculty
 Larry Woiwode, accomplished author and poet, serving as Poet Laureate of the State of North Dakota since 1995
 William A. Wojnar, classical organist and Professor Emeritus of Music

See also 
 Voorhees Chapel

References

External links
 Official website
 Official athletics website

 
Private universities and colleges in North Dakota
Educational institutions established in 1883
Education in Stutsman County, North Dakota
Buildings and structures in Jamestown, North Dakota
Universities and colleges affiliated with the Presbyterian Church (USA)
1883 establishments in Dakota Territory
Liberal arts colleges in North Dakota